The 2020 Montgomery Bowl was a college football bowl game played on December 23, 2020, at the Cramton Bowl in Montgomery, Alabama. The game was broadcast on ESPN, with kickoff at 7:00 p.m. EST (6:00 p.m. local CST). It was the inaugural, and potentially only, edition of the Montgomery Bowl. It was one of two bowl games, along with the Camellia Bowl, that were played at the Cramton Bowl following the 2020 FBS football season.

Teams
The 2020 Montgomery Bowl was contested by the Florida Atlantic Owls, from Conference USA, and the Memphis Tigers, from the American Athletic Conference ("The American"). The two teams met once previously; the Owls defeated the Tigers in the 2007 New Orleans Bowl, 44–27.

Memphis

Memphis of The American entered the bowl with an overall record of 7–3 (5–3 in conference play); they were ranked as high as number 16 in the AP Poll early in the season.

Florida Atlantic

Florida Atlantic of C–USA entered the bowl with an overall record of 5–3 (4–2 in conference play).

Game summary

Statistics

See also
 2020 Camellia Bowl, held at the same venue

Notes

References

External links

Game statistics at statbroadcast.com

Montgomery Bowl
Montgomery Bowl
Florida Atlantic Owls football bowl games
Memphis Tigers football bowl games
Montgomery Bowl
Montgomery Bowl